Ainola railway station, formerly Kyrölä railway station, is a Helsinki commuter rail station in the town of Järvenpää, Finland. The station is served by Helsinki commuter rail R- and T-line trains. Trains to Helsinki depart from track one and trains to Riihimäki depart from track two.

The station was renamed Ainola on 1 June 2015 to celebrate the 150th anniversary of the composer Jean Sibelius. Ainola was his and his wife Aino's home. The walk from the station to Ainola takes  around 20 minutes.

References

Railway stations in Uusimaa
Railway stations opened in 1949
Järvenpää